His Majesty (April 17, 1968 – September 21, 1995) was an American Thoroughbred racehorse and top sire.

Background
His Majesty was bred by John W. Galbreath and raced under the colors of his Darby Dan Farm. A full brother to Graustark, His Majesty was a son of the undefeated superstar European runner and three-time Leading sire in Great Britain and Ireland, Ribot. His dam was the excellent runner and outstanding broodmare, Flower Bowl who hemorrhaged to death the morning after his birth. His Majesty was trained by Lou Rondinello.

Racing career

1971: Three-Year-Old Season
At age three, His Majesty started 1971 at Florida's Hialeah Park Race Track where he won two of his first three starts.

Then he recovered from being forced into the rail and stumbling badly to finish third in the Bahamas Stakes.

He then won the Everglades Stakes on February 17 under jockey Braulio Baeza.

Injured in the Flamingo Stakes in which he finished sixth, His Majesty underwent surgery for a broken bone in his right front ankle and was sidelined for nine months.

1972: Four-Year-Old Season
Racing at age four, His Majesty finished second by a nose to stablemate Good Counsel in the Widener Handicap at Hialeah Park on March 25. but was injured again while preparing for the May 30 Hawthorne Gold Cup and was out of racing for another five months. Returning to race at Hialeah Park in January 1973, His Majesty set a new track record of 1:46 2/5 for a mile and an eighth on dirt but in the ensuing March 10, 1973 Donn Handicap he suffered a tendon injury that ended his racing career.

Stud Record
Retired to stud duty at Darby Dan Farm in Lexington, Kentucky, His Majesty became an influential sire of more than fifty stakes winners as well as a prominent broodmare sire. Among his most notable progeny were:
 Asaltante (1974) - winner of the Handicap de las Américas
 Mehmet (1978) - a multiple stakes winner including the Philip H. Iselin Stakes
 Pleasant Colony (1978) - winner of the Kentucky Derby and Preakness Stakes, and the 1981 American Champion Three-Year-Old Male Horse
 Majesty's Prince (1979) - winner of the Canadian International Stakes in 1982 and 1984, the Man o' War Stakes in 1983 and 1984, and the Sword Dancer Handicap in 1983 and 1984
 Country Pine (1980) - winner of the Withers Stakes
 Tight Spot (1987) - the 1991 American Champion Male Turf Horse and winner of the Arlington Million, Eddie Read Handicap, and Del Mar Derby

Through his daughter, Razyana, His Majesty is the damsire of the outstanding international sire Danehill.

His Majesty was the grandsire of the 1993 Belmont Stakes winner Colonial Affair and of the 1994 Kentucky Derby winner Go For Gin. He was also the damsire of:
 Risen Moon - winner of the 1990 Cambridgeshire Handicap in England
 Midway Lady - winner of the 1985 Prix Marcel Boussac and the 1986 1,000 Guineas Stakes and Epsom Oaks
 Parade Ground - winner of the 1998 Lawrence Realization Stakes, National Museum of Racing Hall of Fame Handicap, Belmont Lexington Stakes, and Tampa Bay Derby

His Majesty died at age 27 on September 21, 1995 from the infirmities of old age. He is buried in the Darby Dan Farm equine cemetery.

Pedigree

References

1968 racehorse births
1995 racehorse deaths
Racehorses bred in Kentucky
Racehorses trained in the United States
Horse racing track record setters
United States Champion Thoroughbred Sires
Thoroughbred family 4-d
Chefs-de-Race